Northward may refer to:

 The cardinal direction North
Northward, Isles of Scilly, part of Old Grimsby, England
 Northward (band), a band composed of vocalist Floor Jansen and guitarist Jørn Viggo Lofstad
 , a requisitioned trawler of the Royal Navy during World War II

See also
 North (disambiguation)
 Northward equinox, the equinox when Earth's subsolar point appears to leave the Southern Hemisphere
 Northward Hill, a nature reserve in Britain
 Northward Ho, an early Jacobean stage play